The Department of National Health and Welfare (NHW), commonly known as Health and Welfare Canada, was a Canadian federal department established in 1944.

Its advisory body on welfare was the National Council of Welfare. In June 1993, Prime Minister Kim Campbell split the department into two separate entities: Health Canada and Human Resources and Labour Canada (later Human Resources Development Canada).

History 

Canada's original Department of Health was created in 1919. It would merge with the Department of Soldiers' Civil Re-establishment in 1928 to form the Department of Pensions and National Health. Soon after, the Department of National Health and Welfare would be established in 1944.

In June 1993, Prime Minister Kim Campbell split the department into two separate entities: the portfolio related to health would form Health Canada, while social-development and income-security programs (i.e., the 'welfare' side) would form Human Resources and Labour Canada—which also combined Labour Canada, the employment programs of Employment and Immigration Canada, and the social-development and education programs from the Secretary of State. Within a few months, a new government was elected, after which Human Resources and Labour became known as Human Resources Development Canada.

Ministers of Health and Welfare

See also

 Healthcare in Canada
 Health Canada
 Welfare in Canada
 Canada Assistance Plan
 Canada Health and Social Transfer
 National Council of Welfare

References

Further reading 
Health and Welfare Canada and Department of Finance. 1982. Better Pensions for Canadians (green paper).
Collishaw, Neil. 2009. "History of tobacco control in Canada." Physicians for a Smoke-Free Canada.
National Capital Alliance on Race Relations vs. Canada (Health and Welfare): A Case Study
https://web.archive.org/web/20120505032106/http://canadiansocialresearch.net/welref.htm
https://web.archive.org/web/20130524112429/http://www.statcan.gc.ca/pub/11-516-x/sectionc/4057749-eng.htm

Ministries established in 1944
Former Canadian federal departments and agencies